Saville Australia was a privately owned property developer in Australia. It holds a variety of residential apartment projects.

With origins dating back over 15 years, Saville Australia has undertaken development projects in some of Western Australia's premier waterside and inner city locations.

Saville Australia's current portfolio is valued at more than $1.7 billion and includes the $1.2 billion Capital Square development, which will see the redevelopment of the historic former Emu Brewery site in the Perth CBD into a residential and commercial precinct housing over 500 residents and 60,000 m2 of office space.

Saville Australia's portfolio also includes Waikiki Blue on the Safety Bay foreshore, Saffron and Altus Luxury Apartments in Perth's CBD and Palazzo Mindarie on the oceanfront in Mindarie.

In 2006 Saville attracted criticism from Australian Prime Minister John Howard for banning tourists taking photos in the vicinity of the popular Southgate precinct in Southbank, Victoria .

In 2007 Saville became the principal sponsor of the Perth Wildcats, a professional basketball team playing in the Australian National Basketball League. The sponsorship runs through to 2010.

In 2009 Saville went into receivership.

References

External links 
 Saville Australia Company Profile
 Saville Australia Official Website

Defunct companies of Australia
Privately held companies of Australia
Real estate companies of Australia